A number of tribute albums to the Pixies, an American alternative rock band, have been recorded since the band's break-up in 1993. Artists featured on the albums range from American rock bands, such as Weezer, OK Go and Eve 6, to lesser-known European bands. The first widely released Pixies tribute album, Death to the Pixies—We're Better!, was released in February 1998 as the result of a Pixies cover contest in the Netherlands that was launched by the magazine Oor, the radio station VPRO and the record label Play It Again Sam.

Tribute albums

References

Pixies (band)
Pixies